The Niger women's national basketball team represents Niger in international competitions. It is administrated by the Fédération Nigérienne de Basket-Ball.

See also
 Niger women's national under-19 basketball team
 Niger women's national under-17 basketball team
 Niger women's national 3x3 team

References

External links
Niger Basketball Records at FIBA Archive
Official Website

 
Women's national basketball teams